Václav Kosmák (5 September 1843, Martínkov – 15 March 1898, Prosiměřice) was a Czech novelist, humorist and satirist.

Kosmák was a priest as well as a writer. Notable for his realism and humor, Kosmák's short stories sketch the provincial life of Moravia. His collected works were published in 1883–1884; a second, more complete edition was published after his death. Notable of his works include Kukátko z kukátek, Jak Martin Chlubil bloudil a na pravou cestu opět se vrátil and Pokoj lidem dobre vůle. The Roman Catholic church where he was a priest, in Martínkov, outside of Prague, bears a monument in remembrance of his contribution to church, community, and the public. His writings were until recently required reading in many Czech schools.

External links
 Short biography 

1843 births
1898 deaths
People from Třebíč District
Czech humorists
Czech male writers
19th-century Czech Roman Catholic priests